Gruver High School is a public high school located in Gruver, Texas (USA).  It is part of the Gruver Independent School District located in central Hansford County and classified as a 2A school by the UIL.  In 2015, the school was rated "Met Standard" by the Texas Education Agency.

Athletics
The Gruver Greyhounds compete in these sports - 

Cross Country, Football, Basketball, Golf, Tennis, Track, Softball & Baseball

State Titles
Boys Basketball - 
1950(B), 1966(1A)
Girls Basketball -
2020(2A), 2022(2A)
Girls Cross Country  - 
1990(1A), 2009(1A), 2010(1A), 2011(1A)
Boys Track - 
1986(1A)
Girls Track - 
1972(B)

State Finalist
Boys Basketball - 
2006(1A)
Girls Basketball - 
2003(1A/D1), 2015(2A), 2023(2A)

References

External links
Gruver ISD

Public high schools in Texas
Schools in Hansford County, Texas